Snæfríður Sól Jórunnardóttir (born 31 October 2000) is an Icelandic swimmer. She represented Iceland at the 2019 World Aquatics Championships held in Gwangju, South Korea. She competed in the women's 100 metre freestyle and women's 200 metre freestyle events. In both events she did not advance to compete in the semi-finals.

References

External links
 

2000 births
Living people
Place of birth missing (living people)
Icelandic female freestyle swimmers
Swimmers at the 2020 Summer Olympics
Olympic swimmers of Iceland
Swimmers at the 2018 Summer Youth Olympics
21st-century Icelandic women